Quelque Show is a Canadian talk show television series which aired on CBC Television in 1975.

Premise
Episodes featured commentary on various topics by members of the public as recorded on location in Montreal.

Scheduling
This series was broadcast Sundays at 3:30 p.m. from 5 January to 23 March 1975.

See also
 Speakers' Corner (TV series)

References

External links
 

CBC Television original programming
1975 Canadian television series debuts
1975 Canadian television series endings